Northbridge Football Club is an Australian semi-professional soccer club based in the Sydney suburb of Northbridge, New South Wales. Founded in 1952, the club currently competes in the National Premier Leagues NSW, with matches played at Northbridge Oval. Northbridge is Australia's largest community club with over 2,500 registered players.

History

Northbridge FC was established in 1952 by local postman Ron Hall who had previously relocated from his work in the coalfields in the Cessnock area of the Hunter Valley. The club originally competed in the Northern Suburbs Soccer Association (NSSA). The original playing strip was a red and white shirt, white shorts and red and white hooped socks. In 1973, Northbridge joined the Ku-Ring-Gai and District Soccer Association (now the Northern Suburbs Football Association).

Association with Central Coast Mariners

In 2014, Northbridge established an agreement with A-League club Central Coast Mariners to form a youth development academy in Sydney's North Shore. As part of the partnership the North Shore Mariners Academy was based at Northbridge FC. The move led to accusations from Sydney FC that the Mariners were encroaching on their territory. On forming the partnership the Mariners stated that they believe Northbridge to be the biggest club (in terms of player numbers) in the Southern Hemisphere.

In 2015, as a result of the Central Coast Mariners affiliation, the club's senior teams changed their name and colours to reflect the Mariners and in doing so, became the North Shore Mariners.

Return to Northbridge name
On October 27, 2020, the club announced it was returning to the Northbridge FC name, as the partnership with Central Coast Mariners was being discontinued.

On December 21, 2020, the announced to form a partnership agreement with A-League club Macarthur FC. The agreement will see all teams play as Northbridge FC Bulls with playing kits incorporating both the Northbridge and Macarthur FC logos respectively.

Men's team

NSW State League 1 / NSW NPL 3

In 2011, after spending their entire existence in the local league, Northbridge FC successfully entered Football NSW's state league competition, the 3rd tier of NSW football and fourth tier overall. They won the NSW State League Division One Premiership in 2013, but went on to lose the Grand Final to Balmain in extra time.

The 2014 season once again saw Northbridge fall short of the title – losing to Hakoah Sydney City East FC 3–2, with Hakoah going on to get promoted to the NSW NPL2.

Throughout 2014 and the years leading up, Northbridge, experienced significant growth, with over 2,300 registered players in early 2014. This made Northbridge the largest club in Australia by participation numbers.

In 2015 Northbridge had a successful season losing only one game late in the season (won 18, drew 3, lost 1) to take out the State League 1 premiership. Northbridge went on to win their first State League 1 grand final in 3 attempts beating Hills Brumbies in a 3–2 win, despite playing the last 15 minutes with 10 men.

NSW NPL 2
The successful 2015 season saw Northbridge promoted to the National Premier Leagues NSW 2 competition for the first time in their history where they started the 2016 season alongside National Premier League debutants Sydney FC Youth, Western Sydney Wanderers FC Youth & Central Coast Mariners FC NPL.

Despite being competitive for the majority of games, the seniors only managed to win 3 matches. In the last round of the season, North Shore needed all three senior divisions (U18's, U20's and 1st's) to win and had to rely on other results to avoid relegation. All three divisions won and at the end of 2016 had finished 13th out of 14 on the Club Championship, thus avoiding relegation with Fraser Park FC dropping to the 3rd tier of NSW football instead.

2017 was a much more successful year for the North Shore outfit, with the Mariners finishing the year in 5th position.

Another year of improvement in the NPL NSW 2 saw the senior team finish 3rd in the 2018 season. Though North Shore were eliminated in the first round of the finals, season 2018 was the highest league position finish for the club to date.

In 2019, North Shore experienced their most successful season in history, finishing first in both the NPL NSW 2 and the club championship, which resulted in promotion to NPL NSW 1. The club sealed promotion on the final round of the season.

NSW NPL 1

As a result of winning the 2019 NPL2 Club Championship North Shore have been promoted to NPL1 for the first time in their history and will play their games out of Lambert Park, Leichhardt.

In 2021 season North Shore become Northbridge FC Bulls will play their games in multiple locations. Their head coach is Mile Sterjovski.

Women's team
The Women's team currently competes in Football NSW Women's NPL Division One however finished the 2019 season in last place.

Home ground
The club its home ground at Northbridge Oval. The Oval had a million-dollar upgrade, including resurfacing with synthetic turf and new floodlights in early 2011. However, as the ground did not meet the NPL NSW 1 criteria, the men's team had to move to play their home games at the Sydney United Sports Centre for the 2021 season. and for the 2023 season.

Current squad
As of February 2023

Club officials

 President: Rory Grace
 Technical Director: Ryan Doidge
 First Team Manager: Joe Haywood
 First Team Assistant Manager: Brian Baker
 First Grade Coach: Will Piriz
 U20 Manager: Brian Baker
 U20 Assistant Coach: Tadhg Purcell
 Goalkeeping Coach: Elvis De-Marchi
 Club Physio: Matthew Grant-Smith

Honours
NPL NSW 2/NSW League One Club Championship
Winners: 2019
NPL NSW 2/NSW League One Premiership
Winners: 2019
NSW State League Division One/NSW League Two Club Championship
Winners: 2013, 2015
NSW State League Division One/NSW League Two Premiership
Winners: 2013, 2015
Runners-up: 2014 
NSW State League Division One/NSW League Two Championship
Winners:  2015
Runners-up: 2013, 2014

References

External links
 Official club website

Northbridge FC
Soccer clubs in Sydney
National Premier Leagues clubs
Association football clubs established in 1952
1952 establishments in Australia